Erich Julius Adolf Bethe (2 May 1863 – 19 October 1940) was a German classical philologist who was a native of Stettin.

In 1887 he earned his doctorate from the University of Göttingen, later receiving his habilitation at Bonn in 1891. From 1893 to 1897 he was an associate professor at the University of Rostock, afterwards serving as a professor of classical philology at the Universities of Basel (1897-1903), Giessen (1903–06) and Leipzig (1906-1931). In 1927–28 he was rector at the University of Leipzig. 

Bethe was married to the German painter Margarethe Loewe-Bethe. 

In 1933 Bethe signed the Vow of allegiance of the Professors of the German Universities and High-Schools to Adolf Hitler and the National Socialistic State.

His better known publications are as follows:
 Thebanische Heldenlieder (Theban heroic songs), 1891.
 Prolegomena zur Geschichte des Theaters im Alterthum (Prolegomena on the history of theaters in antiquity), 1896.
 Homer, Dichtung und Sage (Homer, poetry and legend), 1914.
 Der troische Epenkreis (The troische epic spheres), 1919
 Griechische Lyrik (Greek lyric poetry), 1920.
 Marchen, sage, mythus  (Fable, legend, myth), 1922.
 Die griechische Dichtung (Greek poetry), 1924.
 Tausend jahre altgriechischen lebens (Millennium of ancient Greek life), 1933.
 Ahnenbild und familiengeschichte bei Römern und Griechen (Ancestral imagery and family history among the Romans and Greeks), 1935.

Literature 
 Erich Burck: Leipzig 1921–1925: Richard Heinze (1867–1929), Alfred Körte (1866–1946), Erich Bethe (1863–1940). In: Eikasmós. Band 4, 1993, S. 61–70.
 Otto Kern: Erich Bethe †. In: Gnomon. Band 17 (1941), S. 142–144
 Herbert Helbig: Bethe, Erich Julius Adolf. In: Neue Deutsche Biographie (NDB). Band 2, Duncker & Humblot, Berlin 1955, S. 185

References 

 Open Library (published works)
 Catalog of Leipzig Professors (biography)

German philologists
1863 births
1940 deaths
Writers from Szczecin
Academic staff of Leipzig University
Rectors of Leipzig University
University of Göttingen alumni
Academic staff of the University of Basel
Academic staff of the University of Giessen
Academic staff of the University of Rostock
University of Bonn alumni
People from the Province of Pomerania